The Red Chesterfield is the eighth novel from Canadian writer Wayne Arthurson.

On May 22, 2020, the Crime Writers of Canada recognized The Red Chesterfield with the Arthur Ellis Award for the best crime novella of 2019. The award comes with a $200 cash prize.

During an interview with Shelagh Rogers Arthurson told her he used the novel to play with the tropes of the mystery genre.

References

Canadian novellas
Canadian mystery novels
2019 Canadian novels